Bundles is the eighth studio album by the jazz rock band Soft Machine, released in 1975.

Overview
By Bundles, only keyboardist and founding member Mike Ratledge was left from the early Soft Machine line-ups; the other members had all previously been in the jazz-rock band Nucleus. Guitarist Allan Holdsworth's prominent contributions set the album apart from previous Soft Machine recordings, as guitar was an instrument ignored by Soft Machine since 1969's Volume Two.

This is the last studio album featuring Ratledge listed as a full band member. Only two compositions by him are included, one of which is less than two minutes long.

Track listing
All compositions by Karl Jenkins except where indicated.

Side one
 "Hazard Profile Part One" – 9:18
 "Hazard Profile Part Two (Toccatina)" – 2:21
 "Hazard Profile Part Three" – 0:33
 "Hazard Profile Part Four" – 1:25
 "Hazard Profile Part Five" – 5:29
 "Gone Sailing" (Allan Holdsworth) – 0:59

Side two 
 "Bundles" – 3:14
 "Land of the Bag Snake" (Holdsworth) – 3:35
 "The Man Who Waved at Trains" (Mike Ratledge) – 1:50
 "Peff" (Ratledge) – 3:37
 "Four Gongs Two Drums" (John Marshall) – 2:31
 "The Floating World" – 7:07

Personnel
Soft Machine
 Karl Jenkins – oboe, soprano saxophone, acoustic & electric piano
 Allan Holdsworth – electric, acoustic and 12-string guitars
 Mike Ratledge – Fender Rhodes electric piano, Lowrey Holiday Deluxe organ, EMS Synthi AKS synthesizer
 Roy Babbington – bass guitar
 John Marshall – drums, percussion

Additional musician
 Ray Warleigh – alto flute and bass flute on "The Floating World"

References

External links
 Soft Machine - Bundles (1975) album review by Dave Lynch, credits & releases at AllMusic
 Soft Machine - Bundles (1975) album releases & credits at Discogs
 Soft Machine - Bundles (1975) album credits & user reviews at ProgArchives.com
 Soft Machine - Bundles (1975) album to be listened on Spotify
 Soft Machine - Bundles (1975) album to be listened on YouTube
 Soft Machine discography (info about the albums) at Calyx

Soft Machine albums
1975 albums
Harvest Records albums